Varignon's theorem is a theorem of French mathematician Pierre Varignon (1654–1722), published in 1687 in his book Projet d'une nouvelle mécanique. The theorem states that the torque of a resultant of two concurrent forces about any point is equal to the algebraic sum of the torques of its components about the same point. 
In other words, "If many concurrent forces are acting on a body, then the algebraic sum of torques of all the forces about a point in the plane of the forces is equal to the torque of their resultant about the same point."

Proof 
Consider a set of  force vectors  that concur at a point  in space. Their resultant is:

.

The torque of each vector with respect to some other point  is

.

.

References

External links 
Varirgnon's Theorem at TheFreeDictionary.com

Mechanics
Physics theorems
Moment (physics)